Hyposmocoma corvina is a species of moth of the family Cosmopterigidae. It was first described by Arthur Gardiner Butler in 1881. It is endemic to the Hawaiian island of Maui. The type locality is Haleakalā.

The larvae have been recorded on Acacia koa, and probably feed on lichen on the bark.

External links

corvina
Endemic moths of Hawaii
Taxa named by Arthur Gardiner Butler
Moths described in 1881